Sergei Oleksandrovych Verbillo (born July 21, 1984) is a Ukrainian former competitive ice dancer. With partner Anna Zadorozhniuk, he is the 2009 & 2010 Ukrainian national champion. Verbillo previously skated with Alla Beknazarova.

Programs 
(with Zadorozhniuk)

Competitive highlights 
(with Zadorozhniuk)

References

External links 

 

1984 births
Living people
Sportspeople from Odesa
Ukrainian male ice dancers
Figure skaters at the 2010 Winter Olympics
Olympic figure skaters of Ukraine
Competitors at the 2005 Winter Universiade